KTFR (100.5 FM) is a radio station licensed to Chelsea, Oklahoma, United States. The station is currently owned by Key Plus Broadcasting, LLC.

KTFR broadcasts a Spanish CHR format to the Tulsa, Oklahoma, area.

History
This station was assigned call sign KTFR on April 9, 1992.

On June 20, 2013, Stephens Media Group (KXOJ) sold KTFR-FM to Roger Chasteen's ABS Communications, Inc. out of Tulsa, OK. ABS Communications, Inc. also purchased KCXR and KEMX from Stephens Media Group at the same transaction; the sale price for the three stations was $500,000.

ABS Communications sold KCXR, KEMX, and KTFR to Key Plus Broadcasting effective August 19, 2015; the purchase price was $800,000.

References

External links
laradioviva.com

TFR
Radio stations established in 1992